Abu Tabareh-ye Do (also Romanized as Ābū Ţabāreh-ye Do) is a village in Gazin Rural District, Raghiveh District, Haftgel County, Khuzestan Province, Iran. At the 2006 census, its population was 199, in 37 families.

References 

Populated places in Haftkel County